Stallingborough railway station serves the village of Stallingborough in North East Lincolnshire, England. It was built by the Great Grimsby and Sheffield Junction Railway in 1848.

The station, and all trains serving it, are operated by East Midlands Railway. The manually operated level crossing gates seen in the photo and the wooden Great Central Railway signal box that operated them have both since been replaced by a modern brick structure and lifting barriers respectively - the new signal box is on northside of the line, and is one of a few little boxes to be built in recent years. The station building is a private house now, but there are shelters on both platforms.

Service
All services at Stallingborough are operated by East Midlands Railway using Class 156 DMUs.

There is a Sunday service of four trains per day in each direction during the summer months only. There are no winter Sunday services at the station.

Services were previously operated by Northern Trains but transferred to East Midlands Railway as part of the May 2021 timetable changes.

References

External links

Railway stations in the Borough of North East Lincolnshire
DfT Category F2 stations
Former Great Central Railway stations
Railway stations in Great Britain opened in 1848
Railway stations served by East Midlands Railway
Former Northern franchise railway stations